Halil İbrahim Pehlivan (born 21 August 1993) is a Turkish professional footballer who plays as a left back for TFF First League  club Çaykur Rizespor.

Career
A youth product of Hacettepe and Gençlerbirliği, Pehlivan began his career with Haceteppe in 2012, before moving to Gençlerbirliği in 2014. He had a short loan with Adanaspor in 2017. On 6 July 2021, he transferred to Gaziantep, signing a 3 year contract.

References

 
 
 

1993 births
Footballers from Ankara
Living people
Turkish footballers
Gençlerbirliği S.K. footballers
Hacettepe S.K. footballers
Adanaspor footballers
Gaziantep F.K. footballers
Süper Lig players
Association football defenders